Naucoris is a genus of true bugs belonging to the family Naucoridae.

The species of this genus are found in Europe, Africa and Australia.

Species:
 Naucoris australicus Stål, 1876 	 
 Naucoris ciliatistylus Linnavuori, 1971

References

Naucoridae